West Republic Township is a township in Greene County, in the U.S. state of Missouri.

West Republic Township is named after the city within its boundaries.

References

Townships in Missouri
Townships in Greene County, Missouri